The Raven is an American trailerable, planing sailboat that was designed by Roger McAleer and first built in 1949.

Production
In the past the design has been built by Sound Marine Construction, the O'Day Corp. and Nevins Inc., all in the United States. Today it is built by Cape Cod Shipbuilding and remains in production. A total of 400 boats have been built.

Design
The Raven is a recreational sailboat, originally built of cold molded plywood. In 1951 it was converted to be constructed of fiberglass, with teak wood trim, including the cockpit coaming. It has a fractional sloop rig with aluminum spars, including a double-spreader mast, supported by stainless steel standing rigging. The hull has a spooned raked stem, an angled transom, an internally mounted, fiberglass,  spade-type rudder controlled by a tiller and a retractable fiberglass centerboard. It displaces  and carries no ballast.

For sailing the design has roller reefing for the mainsail, dual self-bailers and a 6:1 mechanical advantage outhaul. A spinnaker is optional.

Class rule changes instituted in 1970 allowed for a one-piece aluminum centerboard, a trapeze, a full width mainsheet traveler mounted on the aft deck and hiking straps.

The design has a Portsmouth Yardstick racing average handicap of 82.6 and is normally raced by a crew of three sailors.

Operational history
When the Raven was first built of fiberglass, starting in 1951, the initial eight production boats were purchased by the United States Coast Guard Academy for cadet training.

See also
List of sailing boat types

References

External links
Official website

1940s sailboat type designs
Sailing yachts
Trailer sailers
Sailboat types built by Cape Cod Shipbuilding
Sailboat types built by Sound Marine Construction
Sailboat types built by O'Day Corp.
Sailboat types built by Nevins Inc.
Sailboat type designs by Roger McAleer